Leslie Reid (born 2 July 1956) is a Canadian Olympic dressage rider. She competed at two Summer Olympics (in 2004 and 2008). Her best Olympic result came at the 2008 Beijing Games, where she achieved 8th position in the team dressage competition. Meanwhile, her best individual Olympic placing is 35th place from 2004.

Reid participated at two Pan American Games (in 1999 and 2003). At the 2003 Pan American Games held in Santo Domingo, Dominican Republic, she won an individual gold and a team silver. Reid also competed at the 2005 edition of the Dressage World Cup Final, finishing in 17th position.

References

External links
 

Living people
1956 births
Canadian female equestrians
Canadian dressage riders
Equestrians at the 2004 Summer Olympics
Equestrians at the 2008 Summer Olympics
Olympic equestrians of Canada
Equestrians at the 1991 Pan American Games
Equestrians at the 1999 Pan American Games
Equestrians at the 2003 Pan American Games
Pan American Games medalists in equestrian
Pan American Games gold medalists for Canada
Pan American Games silver medalists for Canada
Medalists at the 1991 Pan American Games
Medalists at the 2003 Pan American Games
21st-century Canadian women
20th-century Canadian women